The Keeper of the Rulers' Seal (Jawi: ڤنڽيمڤن موهور بسر راج٢) is the government official in Malaysia charged with custody and use of the Rulers' Seal of Malaysia on behalf of the Conference of Rulers. The Rulers' Seal is the symbol of the traditional authority of the royal institutions in Malaysia, namely the Yang di-Pertuan Agong (Paramount Ruler) and the hereditary rulers of the states of Malaysia. The Keeper of the Rulers' Seal is the secretary to the Conference of Rulers and convenes the Conference three times a year, or at the request of the Yang di-Pertuan Agong. He is appointed by the Conference as specified in the Constitution of Malaysia.

His most publicly visible role is to announce the beginning of fasting during the month of Ramadan, and the dates of the Muslim religious holidays, Aidilfitri and Aidiladha, in Malaysia.

History
The office of the Keeper of the Rulers' Seal was established in preparation for the first meeting of the Conference of Rulers on February 18, 1948. Prior to independence, the Keeper of the Rulers' Seal was a senior government position, equal in stature to the most senior Menteri Besar among the states in the Federation of Malaya. This changed after independence in 1957, when all the rulers became constitutional monarchs under the federal and state constitutions.

Role

The Keeper of the Rulers' Seal's primary administrative responsibility is to convene the Conference of Rulers by serving notices to the nine hereditary rulers and four non-hereditary Yang di-Pertua Negeri (governors). His office is responsible for arranging the transportation of the rulers and governors from their respective states to the meeting venue. During special meetings of the Conference to elect a new Yang di-Pertuan Agong, he is responsible for distributing and then counting the ballot papers, which are kept secret.

The second highest position in the Office of the Keeper of the Rulers' Seal is the Assistant Secretary of the Conference of Rulers, who assists in managing the Conference's meetings and elections.

List of Keepers of the Rulers' Seal
Listed below are Keepers of the Rulers' Seal from 1948 to present:

See also
 Keeper of the Seals

References

External links
 Pejabat Penyimpan Mohor Besar Raja-raja (Office of the Keeper of the Rulers' Seal) 

Federal ministries, departments and agencies of Malaysia
Malaysian monarchy
Malaysian constitutional law
1948 establishments in Malaya
Government agencies established in 1948